

References

 EINECS number 
      (Glycine)

Chemical data pages
Chemical data pages cleanup